The Combined Independent Colleges (CIC) was a former junior sports association of 14 independent schools in south-east Queensland. It was founded in 1957 and dissolved in 2014 with the headmasters of the Great Public Schools and Associated Independent Colleges expanding their respective competitions to include students from grades 5 to 12.

The CIC was originally known as the CCC (Combined Catholic Colleges) but was renamed after some Anglican schools were accepted into the association.

The association was primarily dedicated to the promotion and organisation of sport between the member colleges but other co-curricular activities such as chess and debating were also conducted.

Member schools at dissolution 

Moreton Bay Boys' College entered the competition in 2009. Other schools that were previously members include: De La Salle College, St Columban's College, Marcellin College, St Paul's School, John Paul College, Ormiston College and Canterbury College.

References

Australian school sports associations